Andisheh (also Romanized as Andīsheh) is a city in the Central District of Shahriar County, Tehran province, Iran. At the 2006 census, its population was 75,596 in 19,945 households. The following census in 2011 counted 96,807 people in 28,035 households. The latest census in 2016 showed a population of 116,062 people in 35,572 households.

The number of people who settled in this new settlement city in 2000 was 31,650, and the number is expected to reach 50,000 by the end of the "Third Plan". Andisheh has a full capacity of 150,000 residents.

Transportation

The city is served by buses from the municipal-run Andisheh Municipality and Suburbs Bus Organization, connecting the city to Tehran and Karaj.

Gallery

References

External links
Government web page about Andisheh

Shahriar County

Cities in Tehran Province

Populated places in Tehran Province

Populated places in Shahriar County

Planned cities in Iran